Sabe is a territory located in present-day Benin, based in and around the town of Savé

In the Yoruba language, the word Oba means king or ruler. It is also common for the obas of the various Yoruba domains to have their own special titles. In Sabe the Oba is referred to as the Onisabe of Sabe

Records for Sabe are fragmentary and conflicting, containing a long succession of rulers styled Ola and Oba. It is suggested by one source that recent rulers alternate between descendants of either of two brothers. 

The list presented here represents the official record kept by the traditional authorities of Sabe.

List of Rulers of the Yoruba state of Sabe

Sources 
 http://www.rulers.org/benitrad.html
 Montserrat Palau Martí. L'histoire de Ṣàbẹ́ et de ses rois : République du Bénin (Les Ṣàbẹ́-Ọpara) (French Edition) Paperback – January 1, 1992

See also 

Benin
Yoruba states
List of rulers of the Yoruba state of Dassa
List of rulers of the Yoruba state of Icha
List of rulers of the Yoruba state of Ketu
List of rulers of the Yoruba state of Oyo
Lists of office-holders

Yoruba history
Benin history-related lists
Government of Benin
Lists of African rulers